Darkness, also known as Darkness: The Vampire Version and Leif Jonker's Darkness, is a 1993 American independent horror film written, produced, edited and directed by Leif Jonker and starring Gary Miller, Randall Aviks and Mike Gisick. The film was heavily circulated on the underground horror circuit and is famous for having a large number of exploding heads in it, more than any previous film of the genre. The special effects were created by Leif Jonker and Miller, who plays a vampire hunter.

Synopsis 
When a group of boys come home after a concert they find plenty of reasons to be afraid of the dark. From the shadows of the night a legion of human-like bloodthirsty vampires breaks. The boys arm themselves to the teeth with chainsaws, machetes, guns and holy water. A pitched battle between the living and the undead is prepared. When the dawn is near, all eyes of humanity head towards a face that overwhelms even the dead.

Cast 
 Gary Miller as Tobe
 Randall Aviks as Liven
 Mike Gisick as Greg
 Cena Donham as Kelly
 Steve Brown as Jodie
 Lisa Franz as Dianne
 Bill Hooper as Glenn

Production 
Jonker wrote the script when he was 17 years old and began production a year later, in 1988. After four days of shooting, he abandoned the production.  He returned to it in 1989 with a new cast and a budget under $5000. Jonker finished post-production in 1991, two and a half years after he began it.

Reception 
Bloody Disgusting rated it 3/5 stars and called it a "diamond in the rough" that has attained a cult following for its gore.  Scott Weinberg of DVD Talk rated it 2/5 stars and wrote, "Lief Jonker's Darkness is one of the cheapest, silliest, and splatteriest no-budget horror flicks you're ever likely to come across.".  Brett Cullum of DVD Verdict wrote, "Despite any shortcomings, this is a movie made by horror film fans for their peers. You can feel the passion seeping off the screen, and somehow a movie that should be fodder for the Mystery Science Theater 3000 becomes a rollicking good time."

Horrorhound.com named it "the goriest vampire film of all time".

See also 
 Vampire film

References

External links 
 
 

1993 films
1993 horror films
American supernatural horror films
American vampire films
1990s English-language films
1990s American films